Qaasuitsup (Place of Polar Darkness) was a municipality in Greenland, operational from 1 January 2009 to 31 December 2017. As of January 2015, its population was 17,168. The administrative centre of the municipality was in Ilulissat (formerly called Jakobshavn).

Creation 
The municipality consisted of the former municipalities of western and northern Greenland, each named after the biggest settlement:

 Aasiaat Municipality (currently in Qeqertalik)
 Kangaatsiaq Municipality (currently in Qeqertalik)
 Ilulissat Municipality (currently in Avannaata)
 Qaanaaq Municipality (currently in Avannaata)
 Qasigiannguit Municipality (currently in Qeqertalik)
 Qeqertarsuaq Municipality (currently in Qeqertalik)
 Uummannaq Municipality (currently in Avannaata)
 Upernavik Municipality (currently in Avannaata)

Dissolution 
Effective 1 January 2018, Qaasuitsup Kommunia was partitioned into two new municipalities:

 Avannaata Kommunia: comprising Ilulissat, Uummannaq, Upernavik, Qaanaaq and surrounding settlements; and
 Kommune Qeqertalik: comprising Aasiaat, Qasigiannguit, Qeqertarsuaq, Kangaatsiaq and surrounding settlements.

Geography 
The municipality was located in northwestern Greenland.

In the south, it was flanked by the Qeqqata municipality. In the southeast, it was bordered by the Sermersooq municipality, however this border ran north–south (45° West meridian) through the center of the Greenland ice sheet, and as such was free of traffic. In the east and northeast it was bordered by the Northeast Greenland National Park.

At the southern end of the municipal coastline were the waters of Disko Bay, an inlet of the larger Baffin Bay, which to the north edges into the island of Greenland in the form of Melville Bay. The coastline of northeastern Baffin Bay is dotted with islands of the Upernavik Archipelago, which was entirely contained within the municipality. In the far northwest near Qaanaaq and Siorapaluk, the municipal shores extended into Nares Strait, which separates Greenland from Ellesmere Island.

Denmark claimed Hans Island as part of Qaasuitsup (now Avannaata), while Canada considers it to be part of the Nunavut region of Qikiqtaaluk.

Administrative divisions

Now in present Avannaata Municipality

Ilulissat area
 Ilulissat (Jakobshavn)
 Ilimanaq (Claushavn)
 Oqaatsut (Rodebay)
 Qeqertaq (Øen)
 Saqqaq (Solsiden)

Qaanaaq area
 Qaanaaq (Thule)
 Qeqertat
 Savissivik
 Siorapaluk

Uummannaq area
 Uummannaq (Omenak)
 Ikerasak
 Illorsuit
 Niaqornat
 Nuugaatsiaq
 Qaarsut
 Saattut
 Ukkusissat

Upernavik area
 Upernavik (Women's Island)
 Aappilattoq
 Innaarsuit
 Kangersuatsiaq 
 Kullorsuaq
 Naajaat
 Nutaarmiut
 Nuussuaq (Kraulshavn)
 Tasiusaq
 Tussaaq
 Upernavik Kujalleq (Søndre Upernavik)

Now in present Qeqertalik Municipality

Aasiaat area
 Aasiaat (Egedesminde)
 Akunnaaq
 Kitsissuarsuit (Hunde Ejlande, Dog's Island)

Kangaatsiaq area
 Kangaatsiaq (Prøven)
 Attu
 Iginniarfik
 Ikerasaarsuk
 Niaqornaarsuk

Qasigiannguit area
 Qasigiannguit (Christianshåb)
 Ikamiut

Qeqertarsuaq area
 Qeqertarsuaq (Godhavn)
 Kangerluk

Language 

Kalaallisut, the West Greenlandic dialect, is spoken in the towns and settlements of the western and northwestern coasts.  Inuktun is also spoken in and around Qaanaaq.

See also 
 KANUKOKA

References and notes

External links 
 

 
Ilulissat
Disko Bay
Former municipalities of Greenland
Upernavik Archipelago
Uummannaq Fjord
Populated places established in 2009